Caroline Robinson, better known under her maiden name, Caroline Beasley, is an Irish jockey. She was the first woman to ride a winner at the Cheltenham Festival in Christie's Foxhunter Chase (in 1983), as well as Aintree's Fox Hunters race (in 1986).

Early life 

Beasley's father, Jeremy Beasley, and mother, Pat Beasley, were both involved in horse racing. She was raised in Shropshire. Her first horse, Eliogarty, whom she rode in Cheltenham and Aintree, was a gift from her father, and was trained in Co. Clare, Ireland, by John Hasset.

References

External links
 Eliogarty
 Eliogarty Grand National Results - GrandNationalBetting.net
 Eliogarty – the horse who made Cheltenham and Aintree history, Weatherbys Point-to-Point, Weatherbys Point-to-Point

Living people
Irish female jockeys
Year of birth missing (living people)